The Recapture of Isfahan was a battle of the Persian Constitutional Revolution which saw the arrival of Mujahideen Bakhtiari forces in Isfahan in early 1909.

References

Persian Constitutional Revolution
1909 in Iran